Thiru Edu-Vasippu is the Indian ayyavazhi festival of melodiously reading the contents of Akilattirattu Ammanai, celebrated in Pathis and Nizhal Thangals. It is read for periods of three days, five days, ten days or seventeen days. But in the Pathis, strictly, it was read for seventeen days and hence completed every year; Thiru Edu was scheduled according to that.

The part which was read on the first day was called Akilam one and the part read on day two was called Akilam two, and so on. Since it was read for seventeen days it was scheduled up to Akilam seventeen.

See also
Ayyavazhi mythology
List of Ayyavazhi-related articles

Ayyavazhi
Religious festivals in India